Ed Valenti is an American television personality and entrepreneur best known as an early pioneer of infomercials and for creating the Ginsu knives. In 1975, Valenti and his business partner Barry Becher founded Dial Media, Inc. (now PriMedia Inc), one of the first major infomercial companies in the world. Valenti is credited with coining a number of phrases widely adopted by the industry, including: “But wait, there’s more!”, “Now how much would you pay?” and “This is a limited-time offer, so call now.”

Books

 "The Wisdom of Ginsu: Carve Yourself a Piece of the American Dream". Career Press (March 2005).

References
 
 

Year of birth missing (living people)
Infomercials
Living people